Aksaray (variants Aksarai, Aqsaray, Aqsarai, Ak-Sarai, Aq-Saray etc.) or Ak Saray, meaning "white palace" in several Turkic languages, may refer to:

Places 
 Aksaray, a city in Aksaray Province, Turkey
 Aksaray Province, a province or “il” in Turkish, of Turkey, named after the above city, of which it is the capital
 Aksaray, Istanbul, a neighborhood of Istanbul
 Ak Saray, newly constructed official residence of the President of Turkey in Ankara, Turkey

Personal names 
 Aqsara'i (died 1379), Persian physician

See also
 White Palace (disambiguation)
 Oqsaroy (disambiguation)